The 2005–06 LEN Euroleague was the 43rd edition of LEN's premier competition for men's water polo clubs. It ran from 14 September 2005 to 20 May 2006, and it was contested by 36 teams. The Final Four (semifinals, final, and third place game) took place on May 19 and May 20 in Dubrovnik.

Preliminary round

Group A

Group B

Group C

Group D

Knockout stage

Quarter-finals
The first legs were played on 22 March, and the second legs were played on 19 April 2006.

Final Four
Bazen u Gružu, Dubrovnik, Croatia

Final standings

Awards

See also 
 2005–06 LEN Trophy

LEN Champions League seasons
Champions League
2005 in water polo
2006 in water polo